The Three Prisoners problem appeared in Martin Gardner's "Mathematical Games" column in Scientific American in 1959. It is mathematically equivalent to the Monty Hall problem with car and goat replaced respectively with freedom and execution.

Problem
Three prisoners, A, B, and C, are in separate cells and sentenced to death. The governor has selected one of them at random to be pardoned. The warden knows which one is pardoned, but is not allowed to tell. Prisoner A begs the warden to let him know the identity of one of the two who are going to be executed. "If B is to be pardoned, give me C's name. If C is to be pardoned, give me B's name. And if I'm to be pardoned, secretly flip a coin to decide whether to name B or C."

The warden tells A that B is to be executed. Prisoner A is pleased because he believes that his probability of surviving has gone up from 1/3 to 1/2, as it is now between him and C. Prisoner A secretly tells C the news, who reasons that A's chance of being pardoned is unchanged at 1/3, but he is pleased because his own chance has gone up to 2/3. Which prisoner is correct?

Solution 
The answer is that prisoner A did not gain any information about his own fate, since he already knew that the warden would give him the name of someone else.

Table
The explanation above may be summarised in the following table. As the warden is asked by A, he can only answer B or C to be executed (or "not pardoned").
{| class="wikitable" style="text-align:center;"
! Being pardoned !! Warden: "not B" !! Warden: "not C" !! Sum
|-
| A || 1/6 || 1/6 || 1/3
|-
| B ||   0 || 1/3 || 1/3
|-
| C || 1/3 ||   0 || 1/3
|-
|}

As the warden has answered that B will not be pardoned, the solution comes from the second column "not B". It appears that the odds for A vs. C to be pardoned are 1:2.

Mathematical formulation
Call ,  and  the events that the corresponding prisoner will be pardoned, and  the event that the warden tells A that prisoner B is to be executed, then, using Bayes' theorem, the posterior probability of A being pardoned, is:

 

The probability of C being pardoned, on the other hand, is:

The crucial difference making A and C unequal is that  but . If A will be pardoned, the warden can tell A that either B or C is to be executed, and hence ; whereas if C will be pardoned, the warden can only tell A that B is executed, so .

An intuitive explanation
Prisoner A only has a  chance of pardon. Knowing whether B or C will be executed does not change his chance. After he hears B will be executed, Prisoner A realizes that if he will not get the pardon himself it must only be going to C. That means there is a 2/3 chance for C to get a pardon. This is comparable to the Monty Hall problem.

Enumeration of possible cases
The following scenarios may arise:
 A is pardoned and the warden mentions B to be executed:  ×  =  of the cases
 A is pardoned and the warden mentions C to be executed:  ×  =  of the cases
 B is pardoned and the warden mentions C to be executed:  of the cases
 C is pardoned and the warden mentions B to be executed:  of the cases

It is now clear that if the warden answers B to A ( of all cases), then  of the time C is pardoned and A will still be executed (case 4), and only  of the time A is pardoned (case 1). Hence C's chances are /() =  and A's are /() = .

The key to this problem is that the warden may not reveal the name of a prisoner who will be pardoned. If we eliminate this requirement, it can demonstrate the original problem in another way. The only change in this example is that prisoner A asks the warden to reveal the fate of one of the other prisoners (not specifying one that will be executed). In this case, the warden flips a coin and chooses one of B and C to reveal the fate of. The cases are as follows:

 A pardoned, warden says: B executed
 A pardoned, warden says: C executed
 B pardoned, warden says: B pardoned
 B pardoned, warden says: C executed
 C pardoned, warden says: B executed
 C pardoned, warden says: C pardoned

Each scenario has a  probability. The original Three Prisoners problem can be seen in this light: The warden in that problem still has these six cases, each with a  probability of occurring. However, the warden in the original case cannot reveal the fate of a pardoned prisoner. Therefore, in case 3 for example, since saying "B is pardoned" is not an option, the warden says "C is executed" instead (making it the same as case 4). That leaves cases 4 and 5 each with a  probability of occurring and leaves us with the same probability as before.

Why the paradox?
The tendency of people to provide the answer 1/2 is likely due to a tendency to ignore context that may seem unimpactful. For example, how the question is posed to the warden can affect the answer. This can be shown by considering a modified case, where  and everything else about the problem remains the same. Using Bayes' Theorem once again:

  

However, if A simply asks if B will be executed, and the warden responds with "yes", the probability that A is pardoned becomes:

  

A similar assumption is that A plans beforehand to ask the warden for this information. A similar case to the above arises if A does not plan to ask the warden anything and the warden simply informs him that he will be executing B. 

Another likely overlooked assumption is that the warden has a probabilistic choice. Let us define  as the conditional probability that the warden will name B given that C will be executed. The conditional probability  can be then expressed as: 

 

If we assume that , that is, that we do not take into account that the warden is making a probabilistic choice, then . However, the reality of the problem is that the warden is flipping a coin, so .

Judea Pearl (1988) used a variant of this example to demonstrate that belief updates must depend not merely on the facts observed but also on the experiment (i.e., query) that led to those facts.

Related problems and applications
 Monty Hall problem
 Boy or Girl paradox
 Principle of restricted choice, an application in the card game bridge
 Prisoner's dilemma, a game theory problem
 Sleeping Beauty problem
 Two envelopes problem

References

Further reading

Frederick Mosteller, .
 Richard Isaac, .

Probability theory paradoxes
Decision-making paradoxes
Probability problems